The Brattonsville Historic District is a historic district and unincorporated community in York County, South Carolina. It includes three homes built between 1776 and 1855 by the Brattons, a prominent family of York County. It was named to the National Register of Historic Places in 1971.

Contributing properties
The Revolutionary House, built in 1776 by Colonel William Bratton (who fought in the Revolutionary War), was originally a one-room log house with a small porch. Later additions were added to the original structure, and clapboard siding was placed over the original logs.

The Homestead, Brattonsville's second house built about 1830 as the home of Dr. John S. Bratton, was significant as the center of an 8500-acre plantation. This 12-room, 2⅛-story antebellum mansion is an example of Greek Revival residential architecture. The interior features Adam mantels, exquisite dadoes, and a carved staircase.

The Brick House, built in 1855, has a two-story brick façade with end chimneys, a two-tiered portico, stucco-over-brick columns, and a two-story wooden wing at back; it was originally a private boarding school for girls.

The district was listed on the National Register of Historic Places on August 19, 1971. In 1997, the district's boundary was increased to comprise 6760 acres, 24 buildings, 12 structures, and 1 object.

Historic Brattonsville
Historic Brattonsville is the  portion of the Brattonsville Historic District that is owned by the York County Culture and Heritage Commission and Dr. Rufus Bratton, and operates as an open-air museum. Buildings include Hightower Hall, The Homestead, and the McConnell House (moved to the site in 1983).

In Popular Culture 
The Brattonsville Historic District served as the location for several scenes in the 2000 Revolutionary War epic film The Patriot. Portions of the Homestead House, including its east façade and porch, were used in scenes depicting Charlotte Selton's (played by Joely Richardson) rural plantation. The Continental Encampment, interior scenes of the Howard family's home, and the plantation at Camden were also filmed on site.

Notable residents
J. Rufus Bratton, physician and inspiration for the main character in The Clansman and The Birth of a Nation

References

Notes

Further reading 
Scoggins, Michael C. York County Culture and Heritage Commission (2014). A Brief History of Historic Brattonsville. OCLC 1249566232.

External links
 Homestead House - Historic Brattonsville

Historic districts on the National Register of Historic Places in South Carolina
Georgian architecture in South Carolina
Buildings and structures in York County, South Carolina
National Register of Historic Places in York County, South Carolina
Museums in York County, South Carolina
Open-air museums in South Carolina